"If You Got the Money" is the second single by Jamie T and the eleventh track on his debut album Panic Prevention. It features a sample from the Inner Circle song "Sweat (A La La La La Long)". On the UK Singles Chart, the single reached number 13.

The B-side of the 7" version features three songs: "A New England", "Here's Ya Getaway", and "If You Got The Money" (Miloco demo version).

Charts

Sales and certifications

References

2006 singles
Jamie T songs